Judge Jeanine Pirro (known simply as Judge Pirro since the premiere of its second season) is an American arbitration-based reality court show, presided over by retired Westchester County, New York, District Attorney Jeanine Pirro. The series debuted on The CW on September 22, 2008 and ended in May 2011.

Synopsis
As with other court shows, such as Judge Mathis and Judge Judy, a former judge serves as neutral arbitrator, and awards the litigants monetary judgments, of up to $5000, which is paid in full by the program's producers. However, this program dealt more with the emotional aspect of each case, which was one of the show's benchmarks.

Production

Judge Jeanine Pirro was recorded in Chicago at NBC Tower, the NBC network's Chicago broadcast base and home to the related courtroom series Judge Mathis, and was produced by Telepictures Productions, distributed in syndication by Warner Bros. Greg Mathis, who presides over the aforementioned Judge Mathis, served as this series' consultant.

Upon its premiere, Judge Pirro was made part of The CW Daytime programming block; meaning that, while technically a syndicated series, it only aired on CW affiliates. Following its first season, The Tyra Banks Show was pulled from national syndication and took over Judge Pirro's place in the CW Daytime lineup, resulting in the series moving to Fox-owned stations, along with regular syndication outside of Fox O&O markets.

In the spring of 2011, Judge Pirro was cancelled due to low ratings, ending its run in June. Also, in 2011, shortly before the show's cancellation, it was nominated for its second Daytime Emmy Award following a 2010 nomination and won the Daytime Emmy Award for Outstanding Legal/Courtroom Program.

Notable appearances
Some reality television stars, along with a wrestler, appeared on the show during its run.

The Honky Tonk Man
Dennis Rodman
Ron Jeremy
Air Force Amy
Joey Kovar
Bianca Golden
Kirsten Stiff Walker
George Weisgerber
Joey Buttafuoco

Honky Tonk Man was a witness for a defendant in a case; the others listed were plaintiffs in their respective cases.

Controversy 
One of the bailiffs, Jimmie Akins, was fired after he was arrested for attempted extortion charges.

References

External links
 

2000s American reality television series
2010s American reality television series
2008 American television series debuts
2011 American television series endings
Daytime Emmy Award for Outstanding Legal/Courtroom Program winners
First-run syndicated television programs in the United States
Television series by Warner Bros. Television Studios
English-language television shows
The CW original programming
Court shows
Television series by Telepictures